The 2014 African Championships in Athletics was held in Marrakech, Morocco from 10 to 14 August 2014. The competition was the 19th edition of Africa senior championships. The competition served as preparation to African athletes for the next continental cup which is planned to hold on 13 and 14 September 2014 in Marrakech. It was the second time that Morocco had hosted the event.

Medal summary

Men

Women

Medal table

Participating nations

 (25)
 (8)
 (11)
 (16)
 (5)
 (5)
 (20)
 (1)
 (1)
 (1)
 (4)
 (1)
 (4)
 (12)
 (2)
 (11)
 (69)
 (1)
 (2)
 (24)
 (1)
 (1)
 (11)
 (55)
 (1)
 (7)
 (3)
 (11)
 (2)
 (9)
 (host) (55)
 (1)
 (6)
 (41)
 (18)
 (1)
 (14)
 (8)
 (37)
 (1)
 (2)
 (2)
 (2)
 (20)
 (6)
 (8)
 (2)

See also
2014 European Athletics Championships

References

Daily reports
 Jon Mulkeen (2014-08-10). Amlosom makes history at African Championships – African champs, Day 1. IAAF. Retrieved on 2014-08-10.
 Jon Mulkeen (2014-08-11). More gold medals and records for Okagbare and Bourrada at African Championships – African champs, Day 2. IAAF. Retrieved on 2014-08-11.
 Jon Mulkeen (2014-08-12). Redemption for Makwala at African Championships – African champs, Day 3. IAAF. Retrieved on 2014-08-12.
 Jon Mulkeen (2014-08-13). Viljoen wins fourth African title, more gold for Mokoena and Chepkirui – African champs, Day 4. IAAF. Retrieved on 2014-08-13.
 Jon Mulkeen (2014-08-14). Souleiman, Ndiku and Ahoure among winners on final day of African Championships – African champs, Day 5. IAAF. Retrieved on 2014-08-14.

External links
 Official website
 Results
 Confederation of African Athletics website

 
African Championships in Athletics
2014
Athletics Championships
African Championships in Athletics
African Championships in Athletics
21st century in Marrakesh
Sports competitions in Marrakesh
International athletics competitions hosted by Morocco